Heterotentaculidae is a family of cnidarians belonging to the order Anthoathecata.

Genera:
 Heterotentacula Schuchert, 2010

References

Filifera
Cnidarian families